The following article comprises the results of the Black Sticks, the women's national field hockey team from New Zealand, from 2011 until 2015. New fixtures can be found on the International Hockey Federation's results portal.

Match results

2011 Results

South Korea Test Series

Japan Test Series

Argentina Test Series

Germany Test Series

XIX FIH Champions Trophy

United States Test Series

VII Oceania Cup

2012 Results

Four Nations (Córdoba)

XX FIH Champions Trophy

Argentina Test Series

Four Nations (North Harbour)

Four Nations (Auckland)

China Test Series

South Korea Test Series

IV Four Nations Cup

XXX Olympic Games

India Test Series

2013 Results

Argentina Test Series

Four Nations (Whangārei)

Four Nations (Hamilton + Tauranga)

I FIH World League Semi-Finals

VIII Oceania Cup

Chile Test Series

I FIH World League Final

2014 Results

United States Tour

South Korea Test Series

China Test Series

I Hawke's Bay Cup

XIII FIH World Cup

Four Nations (Dublin)

XX Commonwealth Games

United States Test Series

Australia Test Series

Argentina Test Series

XXI FIH Champions Trophy

2015 Results

Canada Test Series

South Korea Test Match

Japan Test Match

Argentina Test Series

II Hawke's Bay Cup

Netherlands Test Series

II FIH World League Semi-Finals

Argentina Test Series

IX Oceania Cup

II FIH World League Final

References

2011
2011 in women's field hockey
2012 in women's field hockey
2013 in women's field hockey
2014 in women's field hockey
2015 in women's field hockey
field hockey
field hockey
field hockey
field hockey
field hockey